Tang Ying Chi (born 1956 in Hong Kong) is a Hong Kong based artist, curator, art administrator, art educator and editor.  Tang is interested in a wide span of local issues including culture, identity and communication in the context of Hong Kong.  She always seeks to explore these topics through her art works, from the identity issue of Hong Kong people during the pre- and post-handover period in 1990s to her recent research on the behaviour of people on the streets in Hong Kong.

Education 

Graduated with a BA (Hons) in Fine Art at the Goldsmiths College, University of London, England, in 1989, Tang was awarded Master of Fine Art and Doctor of Fine Art degrees at the Royal Melbourne Institute of Technology University in Australia in 2003 and 2008 respectively.

Work 

Tang has become active in Hong Kong art scene since 1990s and has been pursuing her career as an artist and art advocate in Hong Kong.   In 2012, she was invited by the Hong Kong Design Institute as the Creator-in-Residency and the Faculty of Art of Chiangmai University in Thailand to participate in an Artist Residency programme.  In 2010, she was the Artist-in-Residence at the Department of Visual Studies of Lingnan University.  In 2008, she was honoured as one of the People of the Times by the British Council in Hong Kong as part of its 60th anniversary celebration. In 1996, Tang received the “Visual Art Award” in the Hong Kong Art Biennial.

Collection 

Tang’s works has been collected by public institutions including the Hong Kong Museum of Art, Hong Kong Heritage Museum, Central Library of Sydney, as well as private collectors and art lovers.

Recent Exhibitions and Art Projects 

2014
We are street people - an interactive project, i-dArt Gallery, Hong Kong
Take Them Home Art Project, JCCAC Handicraft Market, Hong Kong
Art PopUP! @ PMQ, PMQ, Hong Kong
Coming Home–Art Container Project Documentation and Art Exhibition, Koo Ming Kown Exhibition Gallery, HKBU Communication and Visual Arts Building, Hong Kong

2013
These Streets Here Are So Nice - New work of Tang Ying Chi, Voxfire Gallery, Hong Kong
Let's take a photo, Street people, various locations, Hong Kong

2010
Walk-in Tuen Mun, A Residency Project at Lingnan University, Hong Kong

2008
Art Container Project, West Kowloon Cultural District, Hong Kong

Organisation 

Tang is the founder of Art Readers which is an organisation that connects art practitioners, curates art exhibitions, encourages art writing and brings its members' research outcomes in print.

References

External links 
 Tang Ying Chi's website
 Tang Ying Chi's blog
Art Readers

Living people
Hong Kong photographers
Hong Kong women photographers
Chinese photographers
Chinese women photographers
Alumni of Goldsmiths, University of London
Alumni of the University of London
RMIT University alumni
1956 births